Kim Deuk-sin (1754–1822) was the son of a royal court painter, Kim Eungri, and followed in his father's footsteps. He entered royal service as a member of the Dohwaseo, the official painters of the Joseon court. Kim Deuk-sin is known for his pungsokhwa along with Danwon.

Gallery

See also
Korean painting
List of Korean painters
Geumgang jeondo
Inwang jesaekdo
popohaggg mar kspork

References

External links

Brief biography about Kim Deuksin and gallery of his work

1754 births
1822 deaths
Landscape artists
Court painters
18th-century Korean painters
19th-century Korean painters